Marocchi is an Italian surname. Notable people with the surname include:

Gary Marocchi (born 1955), Australian footballer and manager
Giancarlo Marocchi (born 1965), Italian footballer
Valentina Marocchi (born 1983), Italian diver

Italian-language surnames